Musubi may refer to:

 Onigiri, also known as o-musubi, a Japanese snack
 Spam musubi, popular in Hawaii
 Musubi, a character in Sekirei
 Decorative knots made to support obi sashes
 Musuhi a concept in Shinto